Benthamina is a genus of flowering plants belonging to the family Loranthaceae.

Its native range is Eastern Australia.

Species:

Benthamina alyxifolia

References

Loranthaceae
Loranthaceae genera